Mehdishahr County is in Semnan province, Iran. The capital of the county is the city of Mehdishahr. At the 2006 census, the region's population (as Mehdishahr District of Semnan County) was 36,093 in 9,573 households. The following census in 2011 counted 41,896 people in 11,997 households, by which time the district had been separated from the county to form Mehdishahr County. At the 2016 census, the county's population was 47,475 in 15,226 households.

Administrative divisions

The population history and structural changes of Mehdishahr County's administrative divisions over three consecutive censuses are shown in the following table. The latest census shows two districts, three rural districts, and three cities.

References

 

Counties of Semnan Province